The Nastro d'Argento (Silver Ribbon) is a film award presented annually since 1946 by the Sindacato Nazionale dei Giornalisti Cinematografici Italiani ("Italian National Syndicate of Film Journalists"), the association of Italian film critics.

This is the list of Nastro d'Argento awards for Best Supporting Actress. Virna Lisi and Stefania Sandrelli are the most awarded actresses in this category, with 4 awards each.

1940s 
1946 – Anna Magnani – Rome, Open City
1947 – Ave Ninchi – To Live in Peace
1948 – Vivi Gioi – Tragic Hunt
1949 – Giulietta Masina – Senza pietà

1950s 
1950 – not awarded
1951 – Giulietta Masina – Variety Lights
1952 – not awarded
1953 – not awarded
1954 – not awarded
1955 – Tina Pica – Pane, amore e gelosia
1956 – Valentina Cortese – Le amiche
1957 – Marisa Merlini – Tempo di villeggiatura
1958 – Franca Marzi – Nights of Cabiria
1959 – Dorian Gray – Mogli pericolose

1960s 
1960 – Cristina Gaioni – Nella città l'inferno
1961 – Didi Perego – Kapò
1962 – Monica Vitti – La notte
1963 – Regina Bianchi –  The Four Days of Naples
1964 – Sandra Milo –  8½
1965 – Tecla Scarano – Marriage Italian-Style
1966 – Sandra Milo – Juliet of the Spirits
1967 – Olga Villi – The Birds, the Bees and the Italians
1968 – Maria Grazia Buccella – I Married You for Fun
1969 – Pupella Maggio – Be Sick... It's Free

1970s 
1970 – not awarded
1971 – Francesca Romana Coluzzi – Venga a prendere il caffè da noi
1972 (shared)
– Marina Berti – La califfa
– Silvana Mangano – Death in Venice
1973 – not awarded
1974 – Adriana Asti – A Brief Vacation
1975 – Giovanna Ralli – We All Loved Each Other So Much
1976 – Maria Teresa Albani – Down the Ancient Staircase
1977 – Adriana Asti – The Inheritance
1978 – Virna Lisi – Beyond Good and Evil
1979 – Lea Massari – Christ Stopped at Eboli

1980s 
1980 – Stefania Sandrelli – La terrazza
1981 – Ida Di Benedetto – Fontamara
1982 – Claudia Cardinale – The Skin
1983 – Virna Lisi – Time for Loving
1984 – Monica Scattini – Away from where
1985 – Marina Confalone – Così parlò Bellavista
1986 – Isa Danieli – Camorra (A Story of Streets, Women and Crime)
1987 – Ottavia Piccolo – The Family  
1988 – Elena Sofia Ricci – Me and My Sister
1989 – Stefania Sandrelli – Mignon Has Come to Stay

1990s 
1990 – Nancy Brilli – Piccoli equivoci
1991 – Zoe Incrocci – Towards Evening
1992 – Ilaria Occhini – Benvenuti in casa Gori
1993 – Paola Quattrini – Fratelli e sorelle
1994 – Milena Vukotic – Fantozzi in paradiso
1995 – Virna Lisi – La Reine Margot  
1996 – Regina Bianchi – Camerieri
1997 – Lucia Poli – Albergo Roma   
1998 – Mimma De Rosalia, Maria Aliotta, Annamaria Confalone, Adele Aliotta, Francesca Di Cesare, Eleonora Teriaca, Concetta Alfano, Antonia Uzzo  – Tano da morire 
1999 – Stefania Sandrelli – La cena

2000s 
2000 – Marina Massironi – Bread and Tulips
2001 – Stefania Sandrelli – The Last Kiss
2002 – Margherita Buy, Virna Lisi, Sandra Ceccarelli – The Best Day of My Life
2003 – Monica Bellucci – Remember Me, My Love
2004 – Margherita Buy – Caterina in the Big City  
2005 – Giovanna Mezzogiorno – L'amore ritorna
2006 – Angela Finocchiaro  – The Beast in the Heart
2007 – Ambra Angiolini – Saturn in Opposition
2008 – Sabrina Ferilli – Your Whole Life Ahead of You
2009 – Francesca Neri – Giovanna's Father

2010s 
2010 (shared)
– Isabella Ragonese – La nostra vita  and  Due vite per caso
– Elena Sofia Ricci, Lunetta Savino – Loose Cannons 
2011 – Carolina Crescentini – Boris: The Film  and  20 sigarette
2012 – Michela Cescon – Piazza Fontana: The Italian Conspiracy
2013 – Sabrina Ferilli – The Great Beauty
2014 – Paola Minaccioni – Fasten Your Seatbelts
2015 – Micaela Ramazzotti – An Italian Name
2016 – Greta Scarano – Suburra
2017 (shared)
– Sabrina Ferilli – Omicidio all'italiana
– Carla Signoris – Lasciati andare
2018 – Kasia Smutniak – Loro
2019 – Marina Confalone – Il vizio della speranza

2020s
2020 – Valeria Golino – Portrait de la jeune fille en feu  and  5 è il numero perfetto
2021 – Sara Serraiocco – Non odiare
2022 – Luisa Ranieri – È stata la mano di Dio

See also 
 David di Donatello for Best Supporting Actress
 Cinema of Italy

References

External links 
 Italian National Syndicate of Film Journalists official site  

Nastro d'Argento
Film awards for supporting actress